Mission Bay is a seaside suburb of Auckland city, on the North Island of New Zealand. The suburb's beach is a popular resort, located alongside Tamaki Drive. The area also has a wide range of eateries. Mission Bay is located seven kilometres to the east of the city centre, on the southern shore of the Waitematā Harbour, between Ōrākei and Kohimarama.  It covers an area of 1.08 km2 (267 acres), about three quarters of which comprises low hills, surrounding the remaining quarter, which slopes down to the sea. Local government of Mission Bay is the responsibility of the Ōrākei Local Board, which also includes the suburbs of Ōrākei, Kohimarama, St Heliers, Glendowie, St Johns, Meadowbank, Remuera and Ellerslie.

Demographics

Mission Bay had a population of 4,341 at the 2018 New Zealand census, an increase of 150 people (3.6%) since the 2013 census, and an increase of 207 people (5.0%) since the 2006 census. There were 1,677 households, comprising 2,016 males and 2,325 females, giving a sex ratio of 0.87 males per female. The median age was 43.3 years (compared with 37.4 years nationally), with 612 people (14.1%) aged under 15 years, 801 (18.5%) aged 15 to 29, 2,115 (48.7%) aged 30 to 64, and 819 (18.9%) aged 65 or older.

Ethnicities were 78.1% European/Pākehā, 4.3% Māori, 1.8% Pacific peoples, 17.7% Asian, and 4.8% other ethnicities. People may identify with more than one ethnicity.

The percentage of people born overseas was 39.3, compared with 27.1% nationally.

Although some people chose not to answer the census's question about religious affiliation, 47.8% had no religion, 40.6% were Christian, 0.1% had Māori religious beliefs, 1.9% were Hindu, 1.0% were Muslim, 1.5% were Buddhist and 2.2% had other religions.

Of those at least 15 years old, 1,695 (45.5%) people had a bachelor's or higher degree, and 234 (6.3%) people had no formal qualifications. The median income was $49,400, compared with $31,800 nationally. 1,338 people (35.9%) earned over $70,000 compared to 17.2% nationally. The employment status of those at least 15 was that 1,983 (53.2%) people were employed full-time, 513 (13.8%) were part-time, and 87 (2.3%) were unemployed.

History 

Mission Bay sits on three parcels of land comprising part of the Kohimarama block bought from the Crown in the early 1840s. The area used to be referred to as ‘Kohimarama’, a name now given to a neighbouring suburb Kohimarama. Present-day Mission Bay takes its name from the Melanesian Mission, which was established by the Anglican Bishop George Augustus Selwyn at the bay at the end of the 1840s. The school also known as St Andrew's College, was an Anglican institution set up to provide Melanesian boys with a Christian education. The stone buildings, designed by Reader Wood, date from 1858 and are built of scoria rock quarried on the volcanic island of Rangitoto.

In the winter of 1860 the mission buildings were lent to the Governor, Colonel Thomas Gore Browne, who organised the historic Kohimarama Conference. The conference was attended by 200 rangatira from a large number of iwi throughout New Zealand and aimed at convincing Māori leaders to reject the Māori King Movement and justify the Government’s war in Taranaki, which had broken out over a disputed land transaction. The conference lasted a month. A wide range of issues were discussed. It gave southern Māori in particular an opportunity to gain a fuller understanding of the meaning of the treaty. In the last week Paora Tuarere (Ngati Whatua) proposed that the treaty should be endorsed by the conference as a "fuller ratification". Tuarere was one of the principal chiefs who gave and sold land to the government in Auckland on the Auckland isthmus. Māori then affirmed the treaty thus reassuring the government that Māori would, in general, support the government rather than the new Māori king. The kingite Wiremu Tamahana attended the conference.  The Kohimarama Conference is said to be unique, since it was the first time Māori had been given the opportunity to hold a rūnanga with Pākehā officials, which was a first step towards representation in the Government of New Zealand.

The Anglican Mission was transferred to Norfolk Island in 1867, but St. Andrews College remained an educational institution, serving as a naval training school, industrial school, and institute for teaching work practices to ‘neglected’ boys.

Mission Bay, was the second location for the Walsh Brothers New Zealand Flying School after moving from Ōrākei in November 1915. For many years they used the bay as a landing area for their seaplanes. It is claimed that during this time they trained at least a third of the New Zealand’s pilots active during the First World War. Hence, Mission Bay was also known as ‘Flying School Bay’. The school closed in 1924, after training over 1,000 pilots.

In 1928 the mission building became a museum, but was found to be unsuitable for the display of artifacts. It was taken over as a heritage property by Heritage New Zealand in 1974 and the former St. Andrews College has since been leased out as a restaurant.

Economy

Retail

The waterfront Mission Bay Shopping Precinct has about 44 retailers, including a four-screen Reading Cinema, with on-street parking.

Eastridge Shopping Centre, located on the upper side of the Mission Bay suburb, has 32 stores including a New World supermarket.

Landmarks and features

Bastion Point
Bastion Point (Takaparawhau in Māori), located on the northern end of the Mission Bay, had strategic importance for both Māori  and Pākehā. Its commanding view over the entrance to the Waitematā Harbour made it a key site for the defence of Māori settlements and later of Auckland City. 
Mission Bay and neighbouring Ōrākei achieved national attention in 1977 when Māori protestors occupied vacant land at Bastion Point. Land which had formerly belonged to the Ngāti Whātua iwi had been acquired cheaply for public works many decades before, and members of the tribe occupied the land for 507 days demanding its return. The site was largely returned to the iwi after a long and not entirely bloodless occupation. The occupation was a pivotal event in shaping the processes by which the Crown investigated breaches of the Treaty of Waitangi. The Waitangi Tribunal set up in 1975, became empowered in 1985 to include historical grievances as far back as 1840.
 
Bastion Point is also the location of the Tomb and Memorial Garden for Michael Joseph Savage. He is one of New Zealand’s most popular Prime Ministers and renowned as the architect of the welfare state. This Art Deco ensemble designed by Tibor Donner and Anthony Bartlett was officially opened in March 1943.

Trevor Moss Davis Memorial Fountain 

This fountain is the centre piece of the Mission Bay Reserve. Trevor Moss Davis was director of the Auckland liquor firm Hancock and Company and died of a sudden heart attack in 1947 at the age of 45. His father Eliot Davis, nephew of Sir Ernest Davis, Auckland mayor from 1935 to 1945, gifted a memorial fountain at Mission Bay to keep the memory of his son alive.  The fountain was designed by architect George Tole and created by Richard Gross, it is constructed of Sicilian marble fluted to catch the light and decorated with three bronze sea monsters gushing water. The memorial is a landmark on the city’s waterfront, regularly sending dancing jets of water as high as 12 m (40 ft) in the air and at night it features a beautiful light show. During the summer young children use it as a paddling pool.

Parks 
Selwyn Reserve - This is the open green space between Tamaki Drive and Mission Bay Beach, often referred to as Mission Bay Reserve. It is named after the first Anglican bishop of New Zealand, George Augustus Selwyn. The reserve and beach together are one of Auckland city’s most popular waterfront locations. During the summer months the reserve hosts music, arts and sports events.

Kepa Bush Reserve - In addition to Mission Bay’s prominence as a beach resort, the suburb is home to the Kepa Bush Reserve, situated on the banks of Purewa Creek, which flows past Ōrākei Basin into Hobson Bay. The reserve is a pocket of native bush bustling with bird life during the day and serene with glow-worms in the gully near the main entrance at night. The reserve honours the memory of Te Keepa Te Rangihiwinui, a Māori military commander and ally of the government forces during the New Zealand Wars. He is also known as Te Keepa, Major Keepa or Major Kemp. During the land wars of the 1860s he fought for government forces against Te Kooti and Tītokowaru.

Education 
The local secondary schools are Selwyn College and Glendowie College,

Gallery

References 

Colonial Architecture In New Zealand. John Stacpoole.  A.H & A.W Reed 1976
Decently And In Order, The Centennial History of the Auckland City Council. G.W.A Bush. Collins 1971.

External links 
 Mission Bay Business Association
 Ngāti Whātua Ōrākei
 Photographs of Mission Bay held in Auckland Libraries' heritage collections.

Suburbs of Auckland
Bays of the Auckland Region
Beaches of the Auckland Region
Populated places around the Hauraki Gulf / Tīkapa Moana
Ōrākei Local Board Area